Lawrence Kelly may refer to:

Laurie Kelly Sr. (1883–1955), Australian politician
Laurie Kelly (politician) (1928–2018), his son, Australian politician
Lawrence P. Kelly (1913–1999), Wisconsin legislator
Laurence Kelly (born 1946), Irish politician
Laurence Kelly (writer), English writer
Lawrie Kelly (1911–1979), Scottish footballer

See also
Laurie Kelly (disambiguation)